Lonny Ross (born 1978) is an American comedy actor and writer.

Early life
Ross was born in Wantagh, New York. He attended and graduated from Wantagh High School in 1996.

Acting career
As part of the ensemble on the NBC sitcom 30 Rock, he received a nomination for a Screen Actors Guild Award for his work as Josh Girard. He appeared in 37 episodes between 2006 and 2009.

Lonny also appeared on the Cartoon Network live action series Level Up as Max Ross, the eccentric billionaire video-game designer. Lonny participated in a Level Up cast panel discussion at Comic-Con.

He has also appeared in the films Good Luck Chuck, The Rocker and College Road Trip.

He has written a comedy pilot for the Independent Film Channel, and a web series for Comedy Central.

Filmography

Film

Television

Video game

References

External links

1978 births
Living people
American male film actors
American male television actors
People from Wantagh, New York
Male actors from New York (state)
21st-century American male actors